Me Está Gustando is the second studio album of Puerto Rican singer Ednita Nazario. It was released in 1976.

Track listing
 "Me Está Gustando" - 2:48
 "Dime" - 2:47
 "Vengo De Regreso" - 2:01
 "Nunca Más" - 2:25
 "Esclava Y Ama" - 3:11
 "Amigos" - 2:31
 "¿Qué Esperas?" - 2:16
 "Cua Cuaracua Cua (Vou Deitar E Rolar)" - 3:02
 "No Soy Igual" - 2:38
 "Te Vas" - 3:16

Personnel
 Voice: Ednita Nazario
 Producer: Samara Productions

Ednita Nazario albums
1976 albums